Undeniable is a two-part British television thriller serial, first broadcast on ITV in 2014. Written by Chris Lang, directed by John Strickland and starring Claire Goose, Peter Firth and Christine Bottomley, Undeniable follows the story of Andrew Rawlins, a murderer who is brought to justice by the efforts of a woman, Jane Phillips, who witnessed him killing her mother when she was seven years old. The two-part thriller was announced on 1 November 2013, with location filming confirmed to take place later that month in Dublin and County Wicklow, Ireland. The thriller was released on DVD on 2 March 2015.

Critical reception
Ellen Jones, writing for The Independent, said of the series

Undeniable, which began on ITV last night, is the televisual equivalent of those paperback thrillers you buy in the airport and chuck away at your destination: serviceably diverting in the moment, instantly forgettable afterwards. Claire Goose might not look back on playing Jane Phillips as a high point in her career, but she’s believable enough as our heroine, a happily married woman, pregnant with her second child. As a seven-year-old, Jane was the only witness to her mother’s murder and now, many years later, she believes she’s spotted the man responsible and is determined to bring him to justice. Jane might have an easier time of it, if the man she’d fingered for this crime wasn’t a well-respected consultant oncologist and all-round affable chap. Andrew Rawlins (Peter Firth) also has a fiercely loyal daughter, Emma (Christine Bottomley), who just happens to be a criminal lawyer.

For his part, Jane’s dad Pete (Robert Pugh) said he’d support his daughter, but he didn’t look too convinced. There was also the awkward matter of Jane’s history of mental instability, and the two false accusations she’d made previously. At least her husband will stand by her. At least until he finds out she came off her anti-depressants and the contraceptive pill in a deliberate attempt to become pregnant with a son, just like her mother was when she died. Writer Chris Lang’s script diligently ensured that even by the very end of this episode the story’s ultimate resolution remained unguessable, but just a few more hints or red herrings might have made the prospect of episode two more tantalising. Is Rawlins actually a cold-blooded murderer? Or is Jane just hysterical? Preferably, the truth will turn out to be some diabolical combination of the two.

Cast
 Claire Goose as Jane Fielding
 Peter Firth as Andrew Rawlins
 Christine Bottomley as Emma Rawlins
 Pippa Haywood as DI Alison Hall
 Nick Lee as DS Mark Renwick
 Shashi Rami as DSI Vikram Singh
 Sarah Winman as Beth Rawlins
 Robert Thompson as Max Rawlins
 Robert Pugh as Pete Phillips
 Felix Scott as Rob Feilding
 Alisha Kelly as Young Jane Phillips

Episodes

References

External links
 

2010s British drama television series
2014 British television series debuts
2014 British television series endings
2010s British television miniseries
ITV television dramas
Television series by ITV Studios
English-language television shows